Bob (Robert) Baldwin (born December 9, 1960) is an American, New York  born, contemporary jazz pianist, music composer, author, inventor, radio host and creator of the NewUrbanJazz Lounge, and music producer. His staunch views on owning his own recorded masters has earned him the title from his peers ‘the Ray Charles of Independent Contemporary Jazz and Soul music’.  As of January 1, 2022, he owns all but 7 of his 33+ studio projects. His album "The Stay At Home Series, Vol. 1" was selected in 2022 as the best contemporary jazz album by the inaugural Jazz Music Awards program. 

Bob learned music from his late father (Robert Baldwin, Sr.) when he was six, and his recording career started in 1983. His debut album, A Long Way to Go, was released in 1988, and his latest (and 33rd) release entitled, The Stay-At-Home Series. All but seven discs in his solo recording catalog are owned by his label, City Sketches, Inc. (see ‘discography’ at bottom of this page). Bob Baldwin cites his father as his first biggest musical influence, and mentioned he was found to have perfect pitch around the age of six, discovered by his father.

He has released more musical full-album recordings as a lead solo artist than any other Mt. Vernon, NY-native or any Westchester-born musician, having released over 33 recordings since 1988 (see discography).

Baldwin has earned five SESAC Music awards, initially for his 2002–2003 airplay of "The Way She Looked at Me", followed by his 2008 airplay on NewUrbanJazz.com, one in 2010 for his Never Can Say Goodbye: A Tribute to Michael Jackson, in 2011 for NewUrbanJazz.com2 / Re-Vibe, and his 2013 album Twenty. His 2015 release, MelloWonder: Songs in the Key of Stevie, which honours Stevie Wonder, debuted at No. 16 on the Billboard Overall Jazz Chart.

He's also written and/or arranged for Regina Carter, The Four Tops, Grover Washington, Jr., Paul Brown]], Richard Elliot, Marion Meadows, Ragan Whiteside,  Tom Browne, Bob James, Will Downing, Freddie Jackson, Rhonda Smith, Dee Brown, James "Crab" Robinson, Paul Brown, Joey Sommerville, Vaneese Thomas, Tiffany Bynoe, Howard Hewitt, Whistle, Michael Urbaniak, the Lisa ("Left-Eye") Lopez'-produced girl group Blacque, Steve Oliver, Mel Holder, Dee Brown, Dee Lucas, Canadian trumpeter Gabriel Mark Hasselbach and Pieces of a Dream.

In 1982, Baldwin was introduced to digital recording by way of MIDI, which he used on a PC Desktop from longtime friend and engineer Wayne Warnecke, and a software program created by Roger Powell called Texture, which he obtained from pianist Bob James in a studio in White Plains at Minot Sound Studios. He began to write, produce and arrange music through MIDI, which was also the basis of how he first built his recording catalogue.

In 1986, Baldwin performed briefly in Tom Browne's band, and in 1987, Browne asked Baldwin to participate on "No Longer I" for Browne on the short-lived Malaco Records Jazz Label. This Gospel-Jazz genre of music was only preceded by the group's Koinonia and the A&M group Seawind in the history of Gospel-Jazz, and Baldwin performed on, co-produced and co-arranged the disc for Browne.

In 2000, he co-wrote and co-produced two songs on Will Downing's All the Man You Need album, which was nominated for a Grammy Award in 2000 (Best Traditional R&B Album). He has also contributed as composer, co-producer and performer on Ragan Whiteside's Treblemaker, which charted over seven top-40 Billboard Contemporary Jazz radio singles.

Featured artists on his own solo recordings since 1988 include; Eric Essix, Kim Waters, Gerald Albright, Phil Perry, Fred Vigdor,  Atlantic Starr original members Sharon Bryant and Porter Carroll, Jr., Noel Pointer, Lenny White, Larry Coryell, Dean James, Jeff Kashiwa, Chieli Minucci, Chuck Loeb, Edson Da Silva, Leo Gandelman, Lil' John Roberts (drummer), James Robinson, Rohn Lawrence, Darren Rahn, Russ Freeman (Rippingtons), Dennis Johnson, Barry Danielian, Poogie Bell, Euge Groove, CeCe Peniston, Najee, U-Nam, Steve Oliver, Toni Redd, Nils Jiptner, Marcus Anderson, Walter Beasley, Onaje Allan Gumbs, Fred Vigdor (AWB), Vivian Green, Brooke Alford, Torquato Mariano, Azymuth members Ivan Conte and Alex Malheiros, and Armando Marcel, as well as the aforementioned Sommerville, Robinson, Washington, Jr., Brown, Meadows, Whiteside, Downing, Browne, Thomas, and Jackson.

Bob has shared the stage with: Kirk Whalum, Dave Koz, Eric Marienthal, Gerald Veasley, Phil Perry, Ken Ford, Regina Carter, Alyson Williams, Buddy Williams, Marion Meadows, Chuck Loeb, Gerald Albright, Lalah Hathaway, Edson Silva, Maysa Leak, Nick Colionne, Warren Hill, Jonathan Butler, Rick Braun, Peter White, Paul Brown, Eric Darius and Adam Hawley, to name a few.

Baldwin grew up in a musical environment. His father, Robert Baldwin, Sr., (1926-2008) was a full-time Engineer, and a part-time pianist who worked local clubs throughout Westchester County, NY, just north of New York City. While his father was a fan of such jazz icons like Mikes Davis, Bud Powell and Oscar Peterson, his older sister, Deborah, was a fan of soul music of the 1960s, including music by Motown, Stax record labels. These early musical experiences profoundly impacted Baldwin's musical path. He's also a fan of his elder cousin, jazz pianist Larry Willis, who played with Blood, Sweat and Tears, Jerry Gonzalez and the Fort Apache Band.

In 1987, Sony founded the Sony Innovator's Awards, an annual ceremony to award aspiring Afro-American artists who have shown outstanding talent in music and the visual arts. In his opening speech at the first ceremony held in 1988, music producer Quincy Jones stated that it was encouraging that a large firm like Sony was providing Afro-American artists a chance to be introduced to the entire nation. Baldwin was awarded the Sony Innovators Award in 1989, selected by Roberta Flack.

At age 20, in 1980, he met his first cousin, Pianist Larry Willis, who played in the original version of the pop group Blood, Sweat and Tears. They reunited at the funeral of Bob's grandfather, Percy Willis in Norfolk, Va. They played at the elder Willis funeral, and a musical bond was created. Bob and Larry later played at the Savannah Jazz Festival in 2008, both opening for headliner pianist Bob James. They maintained a musical and family bond since 1990.

Out of necessity to maintain creative control, he independently learned how to record music from engineers Wayne Warnecke in White Plains and Mamaroneck, NY, and Keyboardist/Engineer Dennis Johnson in Yonkers, NY. In 1990, Baldwin worked briefly with producer/arranger/keyboardist Kashif, where he learned about the ‘wall of sound’ vocal panning technique. In 1989 -1990, he was hired by Kashif to play keyboards and piano on a recording project by a new group called The Promise (Arista Records) featuring vocalist Joi Cardwell, but the project was never released.

Education
Bob Baldwin attended Geneva College in 1978, and graduated in 1986, but to complete his degree, he would have to attend several New York-based Colleges, including Hunter, Concordia and Iona, transferring credits back to Geneva between 1980-1986. He majored in Business Administration, minoring in Broadcast Communication.

At Geneva College, he discovered Broadcasting radio, and hosted his first radio program at college radio station WGEV from 1979-1980, and after falling short on college funding at Geneva, he returned to New York in 1981, where he completed his college degree, and while in New York, he further developed his broadcasting skills. He later founded the NewUrbanJazz radio program in 2008, which originally aired on WFSK, WNAA, WJAB, WVAS, and WVSU.

Baldwin is listed as a famous Geneva College Alumni, according to Ranker.

Radio career
Between 1978-1980, Baldwin discovered his love of radio at Geneva College at WGEV, where he minored in Broadcast Communications. It was there he learned radio production, and was a jazz jock on Sunday nights. At Geneva College, he also re-ignited his love for the piano.

Baldwin returned to New York in January 1981, to utilize and further hone both his music and radio skills. He finished his college career at Concordia, Hunter and Iona Colleges while doing local gigs in the Bronx, Manhattan, and Westchester County.

In September 1981, Baldwin secured a radio internship at Inner City Broadcasting (WLIB/WBLS) in New York, NY, then owned by Tuskegee Airman Percy Sutton, where he studied news reporting, and honed other broadcasting skills under the tutelage of then News Director Pat Prescott, the late Carl Ferguson News Director David Lampel, Larry Hardesty, and Mark Reilly.

In 1981-1983, he worked briefly at WINS, then-owned by Westinghouse Broadcasting, where he pulled news wire for the staff writers.

In 1984, he was a field news reporter in Westchester County for WVIP Radio, then located in Mt. Kisco, NY (now located in New Rochelle, NY). He covered the Jesse Jackson Presidential campaign that same year when Jackson came to Shiloh Baptist Church in New Rochelle.

Baldwin reunited with the aforementioned Prescott when she worked for CD101.9 in New York. Prescott introduced Baldwin's music there in the late 1980s. Between 1998 and 2004, he wrote, sang and produced the CD101.9 jingle, up to when they changed their smooth jazz format to "New York Chill" in 2004.

In 2004, he was hired by Tame Broadcasting as the Music Director at WJSJ (Jacksonville, Fl.), and after that tenure, he helped to launch the first ever smooth jazz station in Bermuda (KJAZ - Trott Communications) from 2005 to 2006.

Baldwin then worked as the Music Director in 2007 at WCLK (Clark University), then later that fall at WJZZ, a Radio-One company. Radio-One's WJZZ became Urban AC “Magic 107.5” at 12:00am.

In 2008, Baldwin started programming music at both WCLK and WJZZ, which he would later coin the programming sound as "NewUrbanJazz". He later founded the NewUrbanJazz Lounge, a weekly syndicated program.

The NewUrbanJazz radio program
In October 2008, Baldwin fused his musician and radio skills and launched NewUrbanJazz Radio, which programs The NewUrbanJazz Lounge, a 2-hour program that is affiliated on over 40 stations in the U.S. WJAB (Huntsville, Al), WFSK (Nashville, Tn), WNAA (Greensboro, NC), WVAS (Montgomery, Al) and WVSU (Birmingham) were their initial affiliate base. NewUrbanJazz is a fusion of contemporary Jazz, fused with Urban and Brazilian flavors, but also spins music from independent artists. Baldwin's decision to launch NewUrbanJazz Radio Format was based on the sudden closure of CD101.9., and his show has expanded to stations in Springfield (WEIB), Atlanta (WCLK), and the U.S. Virgin Islands (WTJX), as well as some stations under the African-American Public Radio Consortium.

Early career
Between March and September 1986, Baldwin, along with New York-based guitarist Al Orlo, created the Bob Baldwin/Al Orlo Project, and they performed on Sundays at the Vinnie Pastore-owned Crazy Horse, a now-defunct small rock and roll club (with a capacity of 50 people) in New Rochelle, New York. It was a workshop-based project to practice and perform live original material written by Orlo and Baldwin.

Baldwin opened up for the aforementioned trumpeter Browne at The Bottom Line, based in New York City, NY. From that performance, he played alongside Browne in his band, and later collaborated with him on his disc No Longer I, a Gospel-Jazz recording in 1987. Through that production, he met Danny Weiss, the then President for Malaco Jazz. They later co-produced Baldwin's first disc, I've Got a Long Way to Go together on Malaco Records in 1988 along with David Wilkes. He began his Contemporary Jazz music career with his first solo album release in 1988 ("I've Got a Long Way To Go") on Malaco Jazz Records. The project was submitted to the Sony Innovators Award in 1989 and won first place. One of the top three finalists included the Detroit music group Straight Ahead. Roberta Flack was the finalist judge.

That award led to his artist signing to Atlantic Jazz, then presided by Sylvia Rhone. He produced 2 discs for in 1990 and 1992 (Rejoice and Reflections of Love). Reflections charted top-20 on the Billboard Contemporary Jazz Charts.

In 1997, Baldwin found the company, City Sketches, Inc., a production music house. It is now where Baldwin houses all of his self-owned recordings.

Since 2000, Baldwin has charted other solo recordings (on various labels) for the Billboard Jazz top-20 charts, including BobBaldwin.com (2000), Brazil Chill (2004), Standing Tall (2002), NewUrbanJazz.com (2008), Never Can Say Goodbye, a Tribute to Michael Jackson (2010).

After recording two projects with the Chicago-based A440 Music Group, his solely-owned record label, City Sketches, Inc., purchased the rights from the A440 Music Group ("Brazil Chill" and "All in a Day's Work"), prior to their bankruptcy filing in 2005.

In 2009, he signed with Trippin' n Rhythm Records and recorded "Never Can Say Goodbye" (2010), and "NewUrbanJazz 2/Re-Vibe" (2011). He severed the deal in 2012.

In 2012, he authored a book, entitled, You Better Ask Somebody, which speaks about his over twenty-five years of experience in the music business.

In 2013, continuing the independent music ownership route, releasing his 20th original disc "Twenty" under the Distribution 13 (Lillian Industries) Music Distribution label. That deal was severed and settled out-of-court after Artist filed a lawsuit for not receiving contractually due royalties.

In 2015, his label has signed with Red River Entertainment, where they distribute the following physical discs of the Baldwin catalog ("MelloWonder - Songs in the Key of Stevie", "The Brazilian-American Soundtrack", "The Gift of Christmas", "Never Can Say Goodbye (A Tribute to Michael Jackson)" - Remixed and ReMastered. City Sketches, Inc. distributes digital recordings via a separate digital aggregator. with The Orchard, which is wholly owned by Sony Music Entertainment, Inc.

In 2018, Baldwin was able to purchase the rights back from his Shanachie recordings ("Cool Breeze" and "The American Spirit").

Other work
In 1997, Baldwin founded City Sketches, Inc., which is a music production, and music event planning company. He has worked with city municipalities in an effort to improve locally produced jazz shows and venues. He has curated music series programs in conjunction with the cities/municipalities of Greenburgh, NY, White Plains, NY, Asbury Park, NJ, Riviera Beach, Fl., and Mount Vernon, NY.

In 2006, Baldwin signed on with Baldwin Piano (owned by Gibson Guitar Corp.) as an endorser.

In the historic The Jazz of the City Atlanta portrait taken by Art Kane in April 2007, Baldwin stands tall—at the height of the stairs of the Atlanta City Hall Atrium—with over 100 fellow jazz musicians surrounding Mayor Shirley Franklin.

Discography (albums)

Billboard Top 30 Radio Singles (as musician, record producer or composer)

References

External links
 
 Photo session at Ford Piano, Peekskill, NY (Photo by Sacha Brezina, Augsburg Jazz Fest, Germany)

1960 births
Musicians from New York (state)
Living people